Martha Goldstein (born Martha Svendsen; June 10, 1919 – February 14, 2014) was an American harpsichordist and pianist, who gave concerts in the United States, North Africa, the Middle East, and Europe. She performed works by George Frideric Handel, Frédéric Chopin, Georg Philipp Telemann, Franz Liszt, Ferruccio Busoni, Johann Sebastian Bach, and others.

Biography
Born in Baltimore, Maryland, Goldstein was trained at the Peabody Conservatory and the Juilliard School and studied with Audrey Plitt, Eliza Woods, James Friskin and Mieczysław Munz. She taught at the Peabody Conservatory for 20 years and at the Cornish College of the Arts. She also performed as a guest artist with the Soni Ventorum Wind Quintet, wind quintet-in-residence at the University of Washington School of Music since 1968.

Many of Goldstein's recordings were first released on LP by Pandora Records, which was founded in 1973 and active for more than ten years. The company went out of business with the advent of the CD. The entire archive of recordings is now available for download without restriction and can be found at many download sites, including Wikipedia (see Commons:Category:Martha Goldstein). Often her recordings reflect historically informed performance, employing original period instruments and tunings.

She died in Seattle, Washington on February 14, 2014. She had two sons, one of whom predeceased her, and was also survived by her husband of more than fifty years, Allen A. Goldstein (University of Washington Professor Emeritus of Mathematics, who passed away on January 21, 2022), four stepchildren, and several grandchildren and great-grandchildren.

Commercial recordings

The Italian Harpsichord. Pandora Records, cat. no. PAN 101.
Bach: Flute sonatas. Complete and Authentic Works from the Neue Bach Gesellschaft. Alex Murray (Baroque flute); Martha Goldstein (harpsichord). Pandora Records (1974) cat. no. PAN 104.
 Chopin: Études, Op. 10; Études, Op. 25. Pandora Records, cat. no. PAN 107.
Bach: Flute Sonatas. Incomplete and Controversial Sonatas. Alex Murray (Baroque flute); Martha Goldstein (harpsichord). Pandora Records, cat. no. PAN 105.
Bach / Martha Goldstein - The Sound of the Keyboard Lute. Pandora Records, cat. no. PAN 111.
Brahms: Waltzes. Pandora Records (1987), cat. no. PAN 119.
Bach: Music for Solo Traverso, Volume I. Alex Murray (Baroque flute); Martha Goldstein (harpsichord). Pandora Records, cat. no. PC 176.

See also

Sonata in B minor for flute or recorder and harpsichord
:File:Bach - Flute Sonata Bmin - 1. Andante - Traverso and Harpsichord.ogg (Wikipedia Featured audio file)

References

Further reading
H. R. Smith Co. (1982). The New Records, Volume 50. Berkeley, California: University of California.
Crystal Record Company (1977). Directory of New Music. Scanned from a holding at the University of Michigan. 
American Guild of Organists (1985). The American Organist, Volume 19, Issues 1–6.
Museum of Art and Archaeology, University of Missouri (1970). Muse, Volumes 4–6.

External links

1919 births
2014 deaths
American harpsichordists
Cornish College of the Arts faculty
Juilliard School alumni
Peabody Institute alumni
Peabody Institute faculty
20th-century American pianists
20th-century classical musicians
20th-century American women pianists
21st-century American pianists
21st-century classical musicians
21st-century American women pianists
American women classical pianists
American classical pianists
Musicians from Seattle
Musicians from Baltimore
Women music educators
American women academics